Nicrophorus chilensis is a burying beetle described by Philippi in 1871.

References

Silphidae
Beetles of North America
Beetles described in 1871
Taxa named by Rodolfo Amando Philippi